Egg Harbor Township is a township in Atlantic County, in the U.S. state of New Jersey. As of the 2020 United States census, the township's population was 47,842, an increase of 4,519 (+10.4%) from the 2010 census count of 43,323, which in turn reflected an increase of 12,597 (+41.0%) from the 30,726 counted in the 2000 census.

Egg Harbor Township was first mentioned as part of Gloucester County in records dating back to March 20, 1693, and at times was called New Weymouth. The township's western boundary was established on May 13, 1761, with the area called Great Egg-Harbour Township. Portions of the township were taken to form Galloway Township, which was established by Royal charter on April 4, 1774. Additional portions were taken to form Weymouth Township on February 12, 1798. On February 21, 1798, the area was incorporated as Egg-Harbour Township. Over the ensuing centuries, portions of the township were taken to create many new municipalities: Hamilton Township on February 5, 1813; Atlantic City on May 1, 1854; Absecon on May 1, 1854; South Atlantic City (now Margate City) on September 7, 1885; Pleasantville on January 10, 1889; Linwood on February 20, 1889; Somers Point on April 24, 1886; Longport on March 7, 1898; Ventnor City on March 17, 1903; and Northfield on March 21, 1905. Geographically, the township is part of the South Jersey region, and is designated as part of the Atlantic City- Hammonton metropolitan statistical area, which encompasses those cities and all of Atlantic County for statistical purposes and are part of the larger Delaware Valley (Philadelphia metropolitan area).

Great Egg Harbor got its name from Dutch explorer Cornelius Jacobsen Mey. In 1614, Mey came upon the inlet to the Great Egg Harbor River. The meadows were so covered with shorebird and waterfowl eggs that he called it "Eieren Haven" (Egg Harbor).

History 
The first residents of what would become Egg Harbor Township were the Lenni Lenape Native Americans, who would spend their summers on the elevated land around the cedar swamp that is now Bargaintown Lake, as well as along the banks of Patcong Creek, where they made use of the abundant fish, shellfish, wild berries, and bird's eggs in the area and collected shells that could be carved to make wampum.

Great Egg Harbor was part of Gloucester County, West Jersey. On May 17, 1694 a law was passed that made this official, reading:

The same Act set the legal boundaries of Gloucester County from the Delaware River, along the Burlington County line to the sea and back up the Great Egg Harbor River to the Delaware River. At that time Great Egg Harbor encompassed all of present-day Atlantic County. In 1837, Atlantic County was set apart from Gloucester County and the Townships were Egg Harbor, Galloway, Hamilton and Weymouth.

Since 1837, ten municipalities have separated from the original Egg Harbor Township, including Atlantic City (1854), Absecon (1872), South Atlantic City (1885; now Margate City), Somers Point (1886), Pleasantville (1888), Linwood (1889), Longport (1898), Brigantine (1903), Ventnor City (1903) and Northfield (1905).

In 2017, Egg Harbor township joined Bellmawr, Cranbury, Montclair, and Woodbridge Township as one of the first five municipalities in New Jersey to authorize medical cannabis dispensaries.

Geography
According to the United States Census Bureau, the township had a total area of 75.47 square miles (195.48 km2), including 67.05 square miles (173.65 km2) of land and 8.43 square miles (21.82 km2) of water (11.16%).

Portions of the township, notably the West Atlantic City and Anchorage Poynte areas, are not contiguous to the main body of the municipality, having been separated from the mainland portion of the township as municipalities were formed, largely since the boroughitis phenomenon in the 1890s.

The township is one of 56 South Jersey municipalities that are included within the New Jersey Pinelands National Reserve, a protected natural area of unique ecology covering , that has been classified as a United States Biosphere Reserve and established by Congress in 1978 as the nation's first National Reserve. Part of the township is included in the state-designated Pinelands Area, which includes portions of Atlantic County, along with areas in Burlington, Camden, Cape May, Cumberland, Gloucester and Ocean counties.

Egg Harbor Township includes the unincorporated communities of Bargaintown (the township's seat of government), Cardiff, English Creek, Farmington, Scullville (formerly known as Jeffers), Steelmanville and West Atlantic City, as well as part of McKee City. Other localities and place names located partially or completely within the township include Devenshire, English Creek Landing, Greenwood, Idlewood, Jeffers Landing, Jobs Point, Jones Island, McKee City Station, Mount Calvary, Pleasantville Terrace, Pork Island, Rainbow Islands, Sculls Landing, and Seaview Harbor.

The township borders the municipalities of Absecon, Atlantic City, Corbin City, Estell Manor, Galloway Township, Hamilton Township, Linwood, Longport, Margate City, Northfield, Pleasantville, Somers Point, Ventnor City and Weymouth Township in Atlantic County; and Ocean City and Upper Township in Cape May County.

Parks and protected areas

There are three wildlife management areas (WMAs) in Egg Harbor Township, two of them in the eastern discontinuous segment of the township. Malibu Beach WMA is located on marshlands between the Great Egg Harbor Bay and Broad Thorofare, covering , and bifurcated by Ocean Drive and NJ 152. It serves as the habitat for several birds, including migratory species in the spring and fall. Known locally as "Dog Beach", the WMA consists of a back-bay pond, dunes, and one of the only beaches in New Jersey that permits dogs. The Environmental Protection Agency designated the beach as a priority wetland in 1994. From 2002 to 2004, the state Department of Environmental Protection purchased Malibu Beach for $975,000 to make it available to the public, with funding from the Federal Highway Administration related to the NJ 52 causeway replacement project. About  of clean sand was dredged from nearby waterways and placed on Malibu Beach. The state also restored the beach's wetlands, and removed rubble and invasive plant species. In 2012, Hurricane Sandy severely eroded the beach, as did Winter Storm Jonas in 2015. In 2017, the city of Ocean City began collecting trash from the site, after the Cape May County Bridge Commission ended collection in Fall 2016, and the state considered shutting down the park.

It is inaccessible by car. Established in 1933, the WMA is the oldest in the state, and spreads across four municipalities in Atlantic and Cape May counties.

Demographics

2010 census

The Census Bureau's 2006–2010 American Community Survey showed that (in 2010 inflation-adjusted dollars) median household income was $69,754 (with a margin of error of +/− $4,024) and the median family income was $78,259 (+/− $4,966). Males had a median income of $52,615 (+/− $3,434) versus $42,227 (+/− $2,127) for females. The per capita income for the township was $29,114 (+/− $1,241). About 4.0% of families and 6.1% of the population were below the poverty line, including 8.8% of those under age 18 and 4.8% of those age 65 or over.

2000 census
As of the 2000 United States census there were 30,726 people, 11,199 households, and 8,108 families residing in the township. The population density was people per square mile (176.1/km2). The racial makeup of the township was 79.42% White, 10.37% African American, 0.21% Native American, 5.05% Asian, 0.05% Pacific Islander, 2.82% from other races, and 2.07% from two or more races. Hispanic or Latino of any race were 6.76% of the population.

There were 11,199 households, out of which 37.5% had children under the age of 18 living with them, 55.3% were married couples living together, 12.6% had a female householder with no husband present, and 27.6% were non-families. 22.0% of all households were made up of individuals, and 7.1% had someone living alone who was 65 years of age or older. The average household size was 2.74 and the average family size was 3.23.

In the township the population was spread out, with 27.9% under the age of 18, 6.6% from 18 to 24, 32.6% from 25 to 44, 23.7% from 45 to 64, and 9.2% who were 65 years of age or older. The median age was 36 years. For every 100 females, there were 94.6 males. For every 100 females age 18 and over, there were 90.7 males.

The median income for a household in the township was $52,550, and the median income for a family was $60,032. Males had a median income of $40,033 versus $30,643 for females. The per capita income for the township was $22,328. About 4.2% of families and 5.4% of the population were below the poverty line, including 6.2% of those under age 18 and 9.3% of those age 65 or over.

Economy
Harbor Square (formerly the Shore Mall) is a redesigned regional mall that had originally opened in 1968, located on U.S. Route 40 / U.S. Route 322.

Development and the Pine Barrens
Egg Harbor Township (along with Hamilton and Galloway Townships) were designated as Regional Growth Areas" by the New Jersey Pinelands Commission resulting in increased residential development. In exchange for the development in Egg Harbor Township, no trees are demolished for housing and other buildings in the Pine Barrens, also known as the Pinelands. The "Regional Growth Area" designation was, and remains, tantamount to a state mandate to construct +/− 30,000 additional housing units in Egg Harbor Township. Neighboring communities, Galloway Township (to the north) and Hamilton Township (to the West) were also designated as "Growth Areas" by the New Jersey Pinelands Commission.

In January 2007, the Egg Harbor Township Planning Board issued site approval for 667 new homes (and a new fire station) in the Farmington section of Egg Harbor Township. The "Village at Farmington" will be developed by PulteGroup  and is proposed to include 140 townhouses, 261 planned adult homes (55 and older) and 259 single family detached dwellings, as well as a community clubhouse, a second club house for 55 and older, recreation fields and walking paths to be constructed on a site covering . PulteGroup will pay over $800,000 to the Egg Harbor Township recreation fund because the club houses and paths do not satisfy the township's recreation requirements for a development of this size and, as part of the approval, PulteGroup will also contribute $350,000 toward the construction of a new Farmington Fire Station with the landowners, Schoffer Enterprises, donating the land.

Once approvals are complete, PulteGroup will build 60 units of each type per year until the project is complete, offering single family homes in the mid $300,000's and the adult homes for $250,000.

The Planning Board has requested that paperwork presented to the homeowners at purchase will "fully disclose" to prospective purchasers that there exists a nearby airport (Atlantic City International Airport, which, in addition to functioning as a full service airport, is home to the 177th wing of the Air National Guard, the FAA Technical Center, a Homeland Security Department Training Center as well as the Atlantic City base of Operations for the United States Coast Guard), meaning they will be in the proximity of the approach and takeoff patterns for both incoming and outgoing aircraft, the Atlantic County Municipal Utility Authority (ACMUA), where all local municipalities bring their trash and recycle. The disclosure will inform prospective buyers that, from time to time, the ACMUA Facility is odoriferous and that a training/shooting range is part of the military/industrial portion of the Airport.

Government

Local government 
The Township of Egg Harbor is governed under the Township form of New Jersey municipal government, one of 141 municipalities (of the 564) statewide that use this form, the second-most commonly used form of government in the state. The Township Committee is comprised of five members, who are elected directly by the voters at-large in partisan elections to serve three-year terms of office on a staggered basis, with either one or two seats coming up for election each year as part of the November general election in a three-year cycle. The Mayor and Deputy Mayor are chosen by the Township Committee from among its members during the Reorganization meeting each January. The members of Township Committee are part-time elected officials.

, members of the Egg Harbor Township Committee are Mayor Laura Pfrommer (R, term ends 2023), Deputy Mayor Joe Cafero (R, term on committee ends 2025; term as deputy mayor ends 2023), Ray R. Ellis Jr. (R, 2024), Paul W. Hodson (R, 2023) and Joe "Tokyo" O'Donoghue (R, 2024).

Federal, state and county representation 
Egg Harbor Township is located in the 2nd Congressional District and is part of New Jersey's 2nd state legislative district.

 

Atlantic County is governed by a directly elected county executive and a nine-member Board of County Commissioners, responsible for legislation. The executive serves a four-year term and the commissioners are elected to staggered three-year terms, of which four are elected from the county on an at-large basis and five of the commissioners represent equally populated districts. , Atlantic County's Executive is Republican Dennis Levinson, whose term of office ends December 31, 2023. Members of the Board of County Commissioners are:

Ernest D. Coursey, District 1, including Atlantic City (part), Egg Harbor Township (part), and Pleasantville (D, 2022, Atlantic City), Chair Maureen Kern, District 2, including Atlantic City (part), Egg Harbor Township (part), Linwood, Longport, Margate City, Northfield, Somers Point and Ventnor City (R, 2024, Somers Point), Andrew Parker III, District 3, including Egg Harbor Township (part) and Hamilton Township (part) (R, Egg Harbor Township, 2023), Richard R. Dase, District 4, including Absecon, Brigantine, Galloway Township and Port Republic (R, 2022, Galloway Township), James A. Bertino, District 5, including Buena, Buena Vista Township, Corbin City, Egg Harbor City, Estell Manor, Folsom, Hamilton Township (part), Hammonton, Mullica Township and Weymouth Township (R, 2018, Hammonton), Caren L. Fitzpatrick, At-Large (D, 2023, Linwood), Frank X. Balles, At-Large (R, Pleasantville, 2024) Amy L. Gatto, Freeholder (R, 2022, Hamilton Township) and Vice Chair John W. Risley, At-Large (R, 2023, Egg Harbor Township)

Atlantic County's constitutional officers are: 
County Clerk Joesph J. Giralo (R, 2026, Hammonton), 
Sheriff Eric Scheffler (D, 2024, Northfield) and 
Surrogate James Curcio (R, 2025, Hammonton).

The Federal Aviation Administration William J. Hughes Technical Center is on the property of Atlantic City Airport, and in Egg Harbor Township.

Politics
As of March 2011, there were a total of 24,922 registered voters in Egg Harbor Township, of which 5,829 (23.4% vs. 30.5% countywide) were registered as Democrats, 6,976 (28.0% vs. 25.2%) were registered as Republicans and 12,108 (48.6% vs. 44.3%) were registered as Unaffiliated. There were 9 voters registered to other parties. Among the township's 2010 Census population, 57.5% (vs. 58.8% in Atlantic County) were registered to vote, including 78.0% of those ages 18 and over (vs. 76.6% countywide).

In the 2012 presidential election, Democrat Barack Obama received 9,854 votes here (54.5% vs. 57.9% countywide), ahead of Republican Mitt Romney with 7,989 votes (44.2% vs. 41.1%) and other candidates with 158 votes (0.9% vs. 0.9%), among the 18,089 ballots cast by the township's 27,052 registered voters, for a turnout of 66.9% (vs. 65.8% in Atlantic County). In the 2008 presidential election, Democrat Barack Obama received 9,741 votes here (53.0% vs. 56.5% countywide), ahead of Republican John McCain with 8,303 votes (45.1% vs. 41.6%) and other candidates with 223 votes (1.2% vs. 1.1%), among the 18,394 ballots cast by the township's 25,393 registered voters, for a turnout of 72.4% (vs. 68.1% in Atlantic County). In the 2004 presidential election, Republican George W. Bush received 7,658 votes here (51.6% vs. 46.2% countywide), ahead of Democrat John Kerry with 6,981 votes (47.1% vs. 52.0%) and other candidates with 106 votes (0.7% vs. 0.8%), among the 14,830 ballots cast by the township's 19,664 registered voters, for a turnout of 75.4% (vs. 69.8% in the whole county).

In the 2013 gubernatorial election, Republican Chris Christie received 6,874 votes here (62.7% vs. 60.0% countywide), ahead of Democrat Barbara Buono with 3,717 votes (33.9% vs. 34.9%) and other candidates with 144 votes (1.3% vs. 1.3%), among the 10,972 ballots cast by the township's 27,827 registered voters, yielding a 39.4% turnout (vs. 41.5% in the county). In the 2009 gubernatorial election, Republican Chris Christie received 5,795 votes here (53.4% vs. 47.7% countywide), ahead of Democrat Jon Corzine with 4,236 votes (39.1% vs. 44.5%), Independent Chris Daggett with 608 votes (5.6% vs. 4.8%) and other candidates with 121 votes (1.1% vs. 1.2%), among the 10,844 ballots cast by the township's 24,942 registered voters, yielding a 43.5% turnout (vs. 44.9% in the county).

Surrounding communities

Note: This includes the adjacent municipalities that are in the "West Atlantic City and Anchorage Poynte" sections.

Education 
The Egg Harbor Township Schools serve public school students in pre-kindergarten through twelfth grade. As of the 2018–19 school year, the district, comprised of seven schools, had an enrollment of 7,432 students and 604.8 classroom teachers (on an FTE basis), for a student–teacher ratio of 12.3:1. Schools in the district (with 2018–19 enrollment data from the National Center for Education Statistics) are
Clayton J. Davenport Elementary School Complex with 753 students in grades K–3,
E. H. Slaybaugh Elementary School Complex with 851 students in grades Pre-K–3,
H. Russell Swift Elementary School with 438 students in grades K–3,
Dr. Joyanne D. Miller Elementary School with 1,110 students in grade 4–5,
Alder Avenue Middle School with 877 students in grade 6–8,
Fernwood Avenue Middle School with 970 students in grade 6–8 and
Egg Harbor Township High School with 2,357 students in grade 9–12.

Township public school students are also eligible to attend the Atlantic County Institute of Technology in the Mays Landing section of Hamilton Township or the Charter-Tech High School for the Performing Arts, located in Somers Point.

The Islamic Academy of South Jersey is an Islamic elementary day school located in Egg Harbor Township.

 Bishop McHugh Regional School in Dennis Township in Cape May County takes students from Egg Harbor Township. The school is under the Roman Catholic Diocese of Camden.

Transportation

Roads and highways

The township is traversed by several major roadways. The Atlantic City Expressway runs through east–west for  connecting Pleasantville in the east to Hamilton Township in the west and connects at Interchange 7 with the Garden State Parkway (at Interchange 38) that runs through north–south for  connecting Somers Point in the south to Galloway Township in the north.

Major county roads that pass through include CR 559, CR 563, CR 575 and CR 585. U.S. Route 40 / 322 run concurrent with each other while going from east to west. U.S. Route 9 also runs through, although very briefly concurrent with the Parkway as it crosses over the Great Egg Harbor.

Public transportation
NJ Transit provides bus service between Egg Harbor Township and Atlantic City on routes 502 (from Atlantic Cape Community College), 507 (from Ocean City), 508 (from Hamilton Mall) and 509 (from Ocean City).

A majority of the Atlantic City Airport is located in the northern area of the township.

Points of interest
 Storybook Land is a park for children on a site covering  that was opened in 1955, featuring storybook characters such as Mother Goose and the Three Little Pigs.
 Jersey Shore Children's Museum provided an environment for children to stimulate creativity, imagination, and learning through interactive play. The museum closed at the end of 2017 in the wake of declining contributions.

In popular culture
 Clique Girlz was a girl group that was established in 2007 as "Clique" by sisters Destinee and Paris Monroe, together with their friend Ariel Moore, all of Egg Harbor Township.

Notable people

People who were born in, residents of, or otherwise closely associated with Egg Harbor Township include:

 Aarthi Agarwal (1984–2015), actress who primarily worked in Telugu cinema
 Anastasia Cannuscio (born 1992), ice dancer
 Steve Coates (born 1950), retired NHL hockey player and Philadelphia Flyers announcer
 John F. Gaffney (1934–1995), politician who served in the New Jersey General Assembly, where he represented the 2nd Legislative District from 1992 until his death
 Toni Ann Gisondi (born 1972), best known for her role as Molly in the 1982 film Annie
 Steve Keiner, winner of the 1999 Nathan's Hot Dog Eating Contest in Coney Island, consuming  hot dogs in 12 minutes
 Ryan Lancaster (born 1985), professional basketball player
 Biz Markie (1964–2021), rapper
 James J. McCullough (born 1942), former member of the New Jersey Senate who served 24 terms as mayor of Egg Harbor Township
 Vincent J. Polistina (born 1971), member of the New Jersey General Assembly from 2008 to 2012, where he represented the 2nd Legislative District
 Cathy Rush (born 1947), former women's basketball program head coach at Immaculata University who led the team to three consecutive AIAW national titles from 1972–1974
 Nicky Scarfo Jr. (born 1964) alleged member of the Lucchese crime family

References

External links

 Egg Harbor Township Official Website
 Egg Harbor Township Schools
 
 Data for the Egg Harbor Township Schools, National Center for Education Statistics
 Egg Harbor Township Community Site (Unofficial)
 Egg Harbor Township Community Website (Free)
 Pinelands Commission Official Website
 The Current of Egg Harbor Township

 
1798 establishments in New Jersey
Cannabis in New Jersey
Populated places in the Pine Barrens (New Jersey)
Populated places established in 1798
Township form of New Jersey government
Townships in Atlantic County, New Jersey
Discontiguous municipalities in New Jersey